is a Japanese footballer. He is a defender.

He was educated at and played for Osaka Kyoiku University before moving to Singapore.

He signed for Albirex Niigata FC (Singapore) from the S.League in 2016 having previously played for Hiroshima Minami High School & Osaka Kyoiku University.

He extended his contract for 2017.

Club career statistics
As of Jan 2, 2017

References

1993 births
Living people
Japanese footballers
Singapore Premier League players
Albirex Niigata Singapore FC players
Association football forwards